Lai da Tarasp is a lake at Tarasp in the Grisons, Switzerland.

Lakes of Graubünden
Tarasp
Engadin
Scuol